North Wagga Wagga (informally called North Wagga) is an inner northern suburb of Wagga Wagga, New South Wales, Australia, located on the floodplain of the Murrumbidgee River, directly across from the city's Central Business District. North Wagga is one of Wagga's oldest suburbs, being settled at approximately the same time as Wagga. Two pubs are located within North Wagga - The Black Swan Hotel and the Palm and Pawn Hotel, as well as a public school, a public hall, a football/cricket ground and a scattering of business and churches.

Due to its flood prone nature, Wagga Wagga City Council long sought to deter development in North Wagga and aimed for its residents to relocate. For many years the level of services provided in North Wagga was inferior to the rest of Wagga, and most alterations and additions to dwellings were prohibited. In 1960, a levee bank was built around Wagga to protect it from flood inundation, however, North Wagga was not included in this protection. It was during this time that North Wagga's slogan "We Shall Not Be Moved" first appeared.

References

Further reading
Morris, S 1980, We Shall Not Be Moved: A History of North Wagga and its School 1880 – 1980.

External links 

Suburbs of Wagga Wagga